Buddhist Tai Hung College is a school. It is located in the Cheung Sha Wan area of Sham Shui Po district of Kowloon, Hong Kong, near Caritas Medical Centre. Established in 1969, it was the second school established by the Hong Kong Buddhist Association.

The school's passing rate is approximately 10% higher than that of the territory average in the HKCEE and Hong Kong Advanced Level Examination.

Curriculum 
Students in Levels One to Three have four classes, two of which are taught in English and two in their native language. Students in levels Four to Six have five classes.

The school offers various subjects taught in English, including Mathematics, Science, Music and Visual Arts. The Life-wide English Learning Committee is dedicated to integrating language learning and communication confidence in English-related activities.

References
 
 
 
 

Cheung Sha Wan
1969 establishments in Hong Kong
Educational institutions established in 1969
Buddhist schools in Hong Kong
Hong Kong Buddhist Association schools